Army Bound is a 1952 American drama film directed by Paul Landres and written by Al Martin. The film stars Stanley Clements, Karen Sharpe, Steve Brodie, Jeffrey Stone, Harry Hayden, Lela Bliss and Gil Stratton. The film was released on October 5, 1952 by Monogram Pictures.

Plot

Cast          
Stanley Clements as Frank Cermak
Karen Sharpe as Jane Harris
Steve Brodie as Matt Hall
Jeffrey Stone as Lt. Peters
Harry Hayden as Mr. Harris
Lela Bliss as Mrs. Harris
Gil Stratton as Burt 
Murray Alper as Military Police Sergeant
Danny Welton as Steve
Mona Knox as Gladys
Jean Dean as Hortense
Carey Loftin as Duke Horner
Louis Tomei as Herb Turner
Joey Ray as George
Larry Stewart as Doug
Steve Wayne as Sergeant
Lisa Wilson as Waitress
Carleton Young as Doctor
Roy Gordon as Minister
Bob Cudlip as Motorcycle Policeman

See also
 Navy Bound

References

External links
 

1952 films
1950s English-language films
1952 drama films
American auto racing films
American drama films
Monogram Pictures films
Films directed by Paul Landres
American black-and-white films
1950s American films